Amine Claude Lecomte-Addani (born 26 April 1990) is a footballer who plays as a goalkeeper for Al-Sailiya. born in France with Moroccan heritage, he became a naturalised citizen of Qatar and made his debut for the Qatar national football team in 2015.

Career
Amine won the Qatar League with his club Lekhwiya in the 2010-2011 season. The team, coached by Djamel Belmadi, included Bakari Kone, Aruna Dindane, Abdeslam Ouaddou, Jasur Hasanov and Karim Boudiaf, among others.

International career
Lecomte was born in France, and is of French and Moroccan descent. He became a naturalized Qatari citizen, and so was eligible for the Qatar, Morocco, and France national teams. In August 2011, Amine was called up by Eric Gerets in the Morocco national football team for the friendly game against Senegal. However, Amine had to call off few days before the game because of an injury. Lecomte got a callup to the Qatar national football team, and made his first appearance in a 1-0 friendly win against Algeria.

References

External links
 
 QSL.com.qa Player Profile
 Official Blog

1990 births
Living people
Sportspeople from Reims
Qatari footballers
Qatar international footballers
French sportspeople of Moroccan descent
Moroccan people of French descent
Qatari people of French descent
Qatari people of Moroccan descent
French emigrants to Qatar
French footballers
Moroccan footballers
Qatar Stars League players
Lekhwiya SC players
Al-Duhail SC players
Al-Khor SC players
Al-Sailiya SC players
FC Sochaux-Montbéliard players
Expatriate footballers in Qatar
French expatriate sportspeople in Qatar
French expatriate footballers
Moroccan expatriate footballers
Association football goalkeepers
Naturalised citizens of Qatar
Footballers from Grand Est